Charles R. Holbrook III (born September 1938) was an American politician in the state of Kentucky. He served in the Kentucky House of Representatives as a Republican from 1972 to 1988.

References

1938 births
Living people
Republican Party members of the Kentucky House of Representatives
People from Ashland, Kentucky